A shoe is an item of footwear intended to protect and comfort the human foot. They are often worn with a sock. Shoes are also used as an item of decoration and fashion. The design of shoes has varied enormously through time and from culture to culture, with form originally being tied to function. Though the human foot can adapt to varied terrains and climate conditions, it is still vulnerable to environmental hazards such as sharp rocks and temperature extremes, which shoes protect against. Some shoes are worn as safety equipment, such as steel-toe boots which are required footwear at industrial worksites.

Additionally, fashion has often dictated many design elements, such as whether shoes have very high heels or flat ones. Contemporary footwear varies widely in style, complexity and cost. Basic sandals may consist of only a thin sole and simple strap and be sold for a low cost. High fashion shoes made by famous designers may be made of expensive materials, use complex construction and sell for large sums of money. Some shoes are designed for specific purposes, such as boots designed specifically for mountaineering or skiing, while others have more generalized usage such as sneakers which have transformed from a special purpose sport shoe into a general use shoe.

Traditionally, shoes have been made from leather, wood or canvas, but are increasingly being made from rubber, plastics, and other petrochemical-derived materials. Globally, the shoe industry is a $200 billion a year industry. 90% of shoes end up in land-fills, because the materials are hard to separate, recycle or otherwise reuse.

History

Antiquity

Americas 

The earliest known shoes are sagebrush bark sandals dating from approximately 7000 or 8000 BC, found in the Fort Rock Cave in the US state of Oregon in 1938. The world's oldest leather shoe, made from a single piece of cowhide laced with a leather cord along seams at the front and back, was found in the Areni-1 cave complex in Armenia in 2008 and is believed to date to 3500 BC. Ötzi the Iceman's shoes, dating to 3300 BC, featured brown bearskin bases, deerskin side panels, and a bark-string net, which pulled tight around the foot. The Jotunheimen shoe was discovered in August 2006: archaeologists estimate that this leather shoe was made between 1800 and 1100 BC, making it the oldest article of clothing discovered in Scandinavia.

It is thought that shoes may have been used long before this, but because the materials used were highly perishable, it is difficult to find evidence of the earliest footwear. By studying the bones of the smaller toes (as opposed to the big toe), it was observed that their thickness decreased approximately 40,000 to 26,000 years ago. This led archaeologists to deduce that wearing shoes resulted in less bone growth, resulting in shorter, thinner toes. These earliest designs were very simple, often mere "foot bags" of leather to protect the feet from rocks, debris, and cold.

Many early natives in North America wore a similar type of footwear, known as the moccasin. These are tight-fitting, soft-soled shoes typically made out of leather or bison hides. Many moccasins were also decorated with various beads and other adornments. Moccasins were not designed to be waterproof, and in wet weather and warm summer months, most Native Americans went barefoot. The leaves of the sisal plant were used to make twine for sandals in South America while the natives of Mexico used the Yucca plant.

Africa and Middle East 
As civilizations began to develop, thong sandals (precursors to the modern flip-flop) were worn. This practice dates back to pictures of them in ancient Egyptian murals from 4000 BC. “Thebet” may have been the term used to describe these sandals in Egyptian times, possibly from the city Thebes. The Middle Kingdom is when the first of these thebets were found, but it is possible that it debuted in the Early Dynastic Period. One pair found in Europe was made of papyrus leaves and dated to be approximately 1,500 years old. They were also worn in Jerusalem during the first century of the Christian era. Thong sandals were worn by many civilizations and made from a wide variety of materials. Ancient Egyptian sandals were made from papyrus and palm leaves. The Masai of Africa made them out of rawhide. In India they were made from wood.

While thong sandals were commonly worn, many people in ancient times, such as the Egyptians, Hindus and Greeks, saw little need for footwear, and most of the time, preferred being barefoot. The Egyptians and Hindus made some use of ornamental footwear, such as a soleless sandal known as a "Cleopatra", which did not provide any practical protection for the foot.

Asia and Europe 
The ancient Greeks largely viewed footwear as self-indulgent, unaesthetic and unnecessary. Shoes were primarily worn in the theater, as a means of increasing stature, and many preferred to go barefoot. Athletes in the Ancient Olympic Games participated barefoot—and naked. Even the gods and heroes were primarily depicted barefoot, as well as the hoplite warriors. They fought battles in bare feet and Alexander the Great conquered his vast empire with barefoot armies. The runners of Ancient Greece had also been believed to have run barefoot.

The Romans, who eventually conquered the Greeks and adopted many aspects of their culture, did not adopt the Greek perception of footwear and clothing. Roman clothing was seen as a sign of power, and footwear was seen as a necessity of living in a civilized world, although the slaves and paupers usually went barefoot. Roman soldiers were issued with chiral (left and right shoe different) footwear. Shoes for soldiers had riveted insoles to extend the life of the leather, increase comfortability, and provide better traction. The design of these shoes also designated the rank of the officers. The more intricate the insignia and the higher up the boot went on the leg, the higher the rank of the soldier. There are references to shoes being worn in the Bible. In China and Japan, rice straws were used.

Starting around 4 BC, the Greeks began wearing symbolic footwear. These were heavily decorated to clearly indicate the status of the wearer. Courtesans wore leather shoes colored with white, green, lemon or yellow dyes, and young woman betrothed or newly married wore pure white shoes. Because of the cost to lighten leather, shoes of a paler shade were a symbol of wealth in the upper class. Often, the soles would be carved with a message so it would imprint on the ground. Cobblers became a notable profession around this time, with Greek shoemakers becoming famed in the Roman empire.

Middle Ages and early modern period

Asia and Europe 
A common casual shoe in the Pyrenees during the Middle Ages was the espadrille. This is a sandal with braided jute soles and a fabric upper portion, and often includes fabric laces that tie around the ankle. The term is French and comes from the esparto grass. The shoe originated in the Catalonian region of Spain as early as the 13th century, and was commonly worn by peasants in the farming communities in the area.

New styles began to develop during the Song Dynasty in China, one of them being the debut of foot straps. It was first used by the noble Han classes, but soon developed throughout society. Women would use these shoes to develop their “lotus feet”, which would entice the males. The practice allegedly started during the Shang Dynasty, but it grew popular by c. AD 960.

When the Mongols conquered China, they dissolved the practice in 1279, and the Manchus banned foot binding in 1644. The Han people, however, continued to use the style without much government intervention.

In medieval times shoes could be up to two feet long, with their toes sometimes filled with hair, wool, moss, or grass. Many medieval shoes were made using the turnshoe method of construction, in which the upper was turned flesh side out, and was lasted onto the sole and joined to the edge by a seam. The shoe was then turned inside-out so that the grain was outside. Some shoes were developed with toggled flaps or drawstrings to tighten the leather around the foot for a better fit. Surviving medieval turnshoes often fit the foot closely, with the right and left shoe being mirror images. Around 1500, the turnshoe method was largely replaced by the welted rand method (where the uppers are sewn to a much stiffer sole and the shoe cannot be turned inside-out). The turn shoe method is still used for some dance and specialty shoes.

By the 15th century, pattens became popular by both men and women in Europe. These are commonly seen as the predecessor of the modern high-heeled shoe, while the poor and lower classes in Europe, as well as slaves in the New World, were barefoot. In the 15th century, the Crakow was fashionable in Europe. This style of shoe is named because it is thought to have originated in Kraków, the capital of Poland. The style is characterized by the point of the shoe, known as the "polaine", which often was supported by a whalebone tied to the knee to prevent the point getting in the way while walking. These shoes became popular in Venice and throughout Europe, as a status symbol revealing wealth and social standing. During the 16th century, royalty, such as Catherine de Medici or Mary I of England, started wearing high-heeled shoes to make them look taller or larger than life. By 1580, even men wore them, and a person with authority or wealth was often referred to as, "well-heeled". In 17th century France, heels were exclusively worn by aristocrats. Louis XIV of France outlawed anybody from wearing red high heels except for himself and his royal court.

Eventually the modern shoe, with a sewn-on sole, was devised. Since the 17th century, most leather shoes have used a sewn-on sole. This remains the standard for finer-quality dress shoes today. Until around 1800, welted rand shoes were commonly made without differentiation for the left or right foot. Such shoes are now referred to as "straights". Only gradually did the modern foot-specific shoe become standard.

Industrial era

Asia and Europe 

Shoemaking became more commercialized in the mid-18th century, as it expanded as a cottage industry. Large warehouses began to stock footwear, made by many small manufacturers from the area.

Until the 19th century, shoemaking was a traditional handicraft, but by the century's end, the process had been almost completely mechanized, with production occurring in large factories. Despite the obvious economic gains of mass production, the factory system produced shoes without the individual differentiation that the traditional shoemaker was able to provide.

The 19th century was when Chinese feminists called for an end to the use of foot straps and a ban in 1902 was created. The ban was soon repealed until it was banned again in 1911 by the new Nationalist government. It was effective in coastal cities, but countryside cities continued without much regulation. Mao Zedong enforced the rule in 1949 and it continues throughout contemporary times. A number of people still have lotus feet today.

The first steps towards mechanisation were taken during the Napoleonic Wars by the engineer, Marc Brunel. He developed machinery for the mass production of boots for the soldiers of the British Army. In 1812, he devised a scheme for making nailed-boot-making machinery that automatically fastened soles to uppers by means of metallic pins or nails. With the support of the Duke of York, the shoes were manufactured, and, due to their strength, cheapness, and durability, were introduced for the use of the army. In the same year, the use of screws and staples was patented by Richard Woodman. Brunel's system was described by Sir Richard Phillips as a visitor to his factory in Battersea as follows:

In another building I was shown his manufactory of shoes, which, like the other, is full of ingenuity, and, in regard to subdivision of labour, brings this fabric on a level with the oft-admired manufactory of pins. Every step in it is affected by the most elegant and precise machinery; while, as each operation is performed by one hand, so each shoe passes through twenty-five hands, who complete from the hide, as supplied by the currier, a hundred pairs of strong and well-finished shoes per day. All the details are performed by the ingenious application of the mechanic powers; and all the parts are characterised by precision, uniformity, and accuracy. As each man performs but one step in the process, which implies no knowledge of what is done by those who go before or follow him, so the persons employed are not shoemakers, but wounded soldiers, who are able to learn their respective duties in a few hours. The contract at which these shoes are delivered to Government is 6s. 6d. per pair, being at least 2s. less than what was paid previously for an unequal and cobbled article.

However, when the war ended in 1815, manual labour became much cheaper, and the demand for military equipment subsided. As a consequence, Brunel's system was no longer profitable and it soon ceased business.

Americas 
Similar exigencies at the time of the Crimean War stimulated a renewed interest in methods of mechanization and mass-production, which proved longer lasting. A shoemaker in Leicester, Tomas Crick, patented the design for a riveting machine in 1853. His machine used an iron plate to push iron rivets into the sole. The process greatly increased the speed and efficiency of production. He also introduced the use of steam-powered rolling-machines for hardening leather and cutting-machines, in the mid-1850s.

The sewing machine was introduced in 1846, and provided an alternative method for the mechanization of shoemaking. By the late 1850s, the industry was beginning to shift towards the modern factory, mainly in the US and areas of England. A shoe-stitching machine was invented by the American Lyman Blake in 1856 and perfected by 1864. Entering into a partnership with McKay, his device became known as the McKay stitching machine and was quickly adopted by manufacturers throughout New England. As bottlenecks opened up in the production line due to these innovations, more and more of the manufacturing stages, such as pegging and finishing, became automated. By the 1890s, the process of mechanisation was largely complete.

On January 24, 1899, Humphrey O'Sullivan of Lowell, Massachusetts, was awarded a patent for a rubber heel for boots and shoes.

Globalization 
A process for manufacturing stitchless, that is, glued, shoes—AGO—was developed in 1910. Since the mid-20th century, advances in rubber, plastics, synthetic cloth, and industrial adhesives have allowed manufacturers to create shoes that stray considerably from traditional crafting techniques. Leather, which had been the primary material in earlier styles, has remained standard in expensive dress shoes, but athletic shoes often have little or no real leather. Soles, which were once laboriously hand-stitched on, are now more often machine stitched or simply glued on. Many of these newer materials, such as rubber and plastics, have made shoes less biodegradable. It is estimated that most mass-produced shoes require 1000 years to degrade in a landfill. In the late 2000s, some shoemakers picked up on the issue and began to produce shoes made entirely from degradable materials, such as the Nike Considered.

In 2007, the global shoe industry had an overall market of $107.4 billion, in terms of revenue, and is expected to grow to $122.9 billion by the end of 2012. Shoe manufacturers in the People's Republic of China account for 63% of production, 40.5% of global exports and 55% of industry revenue. However, many manufacturers in Europe dominate the higher-priced, higher value-added end of the market.

Culture and folklore 

As an integral part of human culture and civilization, shoes have found their way into our culture, folklore, and art. A popular 18th-century nursery rhyme is There was an Old Woman Who Lived in a Shoe. This story tells about an old woman living in a shoe with a lot of children. In 1948, Mahlon Haines, a shoe salesman in Hallam, Pennsylvania, built an actual house shaped like a work boot as a form of advertisement. The Haines Shoe House was rented to newlyweds and the elderly until his death in 1962. Since then, it has served as an ice cream parlor, a bed and breakfast, and a museum. It still stands today and is a popular roadside attraction.

Shoes also play an important role in the fairy tales Cinderella and The Red Shoes. In the movie adaption of the children's book The Wonderful Wizard of Oz, a pair of red ruby slippers play a key role in the plot. The 1985 comedy The Man with One Red Shoe features an eccentric man wearing one normal business shoe and one red shoe that becomes central to the plot.

One poem, written by Phebus Etienne with the title “Shoes”, focuses on them. It describes religious messages and is 3 stanzas long. The first stanza is one line, whereas the second is 13 lines and the third being 14 lines. Throughout the poem the main character talks about their dead mother and their routine with her grave. Haitians are said to "not put shoes on the dead." as it makes spirits easier to “step over the offerings”.

Athletic sneaker collection has also existed as a part of urban subculture in the United States for several decades. Recent decades have seen this trend spread to European nations such as the Czech Republic. A Sneakerhead is a person who owns multiple pairs of shoes as a form of collection and fashion. A contributor to the growth of sneaker collecting is the continued worldwide popularity of the Air Jordan line of sneakers designed by Nike for Basketball star Michael Jordan.

In the Bible's Old Testament, the shoe is used to symbolize something that is worthless or of little value. In the New Testament, the act of removing one's shoes symbolizes servitude. Ancient Semitic-speaking peoples regarded the act of removing their shoes as a mark of reverence when approaching a sacred person or place. In the Book of Exodus, Moses was instructed to remove his shoes before approaching the burning bush:

The removal of the shoe also symbolizes the act of giving up a legal right. In Hebrew custom, if a man chose not to marry his childless brother's widow, the widow removed her brother-in-law's shoe to symbolize that he had abandoned his duty. In Arab custom, the removal of one's shoe also symbolized the dissolution of marriage.

In Arab culture, showing the sole of one's shoe is considered an insult, and to throw a shoe and hit someone with it is considered an even greater insult. Shoes are considered to be dirty as they frequently touch the ground, and are associated with the lowest part of the body—the foot. As such, shoes are forbidden in mosques, and it is also considered unmannerly to cross the legs and display the soles of one's shoes during conversation. This insult was demonstrated in Iraq, first when Saddam Hussein's statue was toppled in 2003, Iraqis gathered around it and struck the statue with their shoes. In 2008, United States President George W. Bush had a shoe thrown at him by a journalist as a statement against the war in Iraq. More generally, shoe-throwing or shoeing, showing the sole of one's shoe or using shoes to insult are forms of protest in many parts of the world. Incidents where shoes were thrown at political figures have taken place in Australia, India, Ireland, Taiwan, Hong Kong, Pakistan, the United Kingdom, the United States, and most notably the Arab world.

Empty shoes may also symbolize death. In Greek culture, empty shoes are the equivalent of the American funeral wreath. For example, empty shoes placed outside of a Greek home would tell others that the family's son has died in battle. At an observation memorializing the 10th anniversary of the September 11 attacks, 3,000 pairs of empty shoes were used to recognize those killed. The Shoes on the Danube Bank is a memorial in Budapest, Hungary. Conceived by film director Can Togay, he created it on the east bank of the Danube River with sculptor Gyula Pauer to honor the Jews who were killed by fascist Arrow Cross militiamen in Budapest during World War II. They were ordered to take off their shoes and were shot at the edge of the water so that their bodies fell into the river and were carried away. The memorial represents their shoes left behind on the bank.

Construction 

The basic anatomy of a shoe is recognizable, regardless of the specific style of footwear.

Soles can be made from a variety of materials, although most modern shoes have soles made from natural rubber, polyurethane, or polyvinyl chloride (PVC) compounds. Soles can be simple—a single material in a single layer—or they can be complex, with multiple structures or layers and materials. When various layers are used, soles may consist of an insole, midsole, and an outsole.

The  is the interior bottom of a shoe, which sits directly beneath the foot under the footbed (also known as sock liner). The purpose of the insole is to attach to the lasting margin of the upper, which is wrapped around the last during the closing of the shoe during the lasting operation. Insoles are usually made of cellulosic paper board or synthetic non woven insole board. Many shoes have removable and replaceable footbeds. Extra cushioning is often added for comfort (to control the shape, moisture, or smell of the shoe) or health reasons (to help deal with differences in the natural shape of the foot or positioning of the foot during standing or walking).

The  is the layer in direct contact with the ground. Dress shoes often have leather or resin rubber outsoles; casual or work-oriented shoes have outsoles made of natural rubber or a synthetic material like polyurethane. The outsole may comprise a single piece or may be an assembly of separate pieces, often of different materials. On some shoes, the heel of the sole has a rubber plate for durability and traction, while the front is leather for style. Specialized shoes will often have modifications on this design: athletic or so-called cleated shoes like soccer, rugby, baseball and golf shoes have spikes embedded in the outsole to improve traction.

The  is the layer in between the outsole and the insole, typically there for shock absorption. Some types of shoes, like running shoes, have additional material for shock absorption, usually beneath the heel of the foot, where one puts the most pressure down. Some shoes may not have a midsole at all.

The heel is the bottom rear part of a shoe. Its function is to support the heel of the foot. They are often made of the same material as the sole of the shoe. This part can be high for fashion or to make the person look taller, or flat for more practical and comfortable use. On some shoes the inner forward point of the heel is chiselled off, a feature known as a "gentleman's corner". This piece of design is intended to alleviate the problem of the points catching the bottom of trousers and was first observed in the 1930s. A heel is the projection at the back of a shoe which rests below the heel bone. The shoe heel is used to improve the balance of the shoe, increase the height of the wearer, alter posture or other decorative purposes. Sometimes raised, the high heel is common to a form of shoe often worn by women, but sometimes by men too. See also stiletto heel.

The  helps hold the shoe onto the foot. In the simplest cases, such as sandals or flip-flops, this may be nothing more than a few straps for holding the sole in place. Closed footwear, such as boots, trainers and most men's shoes, will have a more complex upper. This part is often decorated or is made in a certain style to look attractive. The upper is connected to the sole by a strip of leather, rubber, or plastic that is stitched between it and the sole, known as a welt.

Most uppers have a mechanism, such as laces, straps with buckles, zippers, elastic, velcro straps, buttons, or snaps, for tightening the upper on the foot. Uppers with laces usually have a tongue that helps seal the laced opening and protect the foot from abrasion by the laces. Uppers with laces also have eyelets or hooks to make it easier to tighten and loosen the laces and to prevent the lace from tearing through the upper material. An aglet is the protective wrapping on the end of the lace.

The  is the front part of the shoe, starting behind the toe, extending around the eyelets and tongue and towards back part of the shoe.

The  is the part of the shoe closest to a person's center of symmetry, and the lateral is on the opposite side, away from their center of symmetry. This can be in reference to either the outsole or the vamp. Most shoes have shoelaces on the upper, connecting the medial and lateral parts after one puts their shoes on and aiding in keeping their shoes on their feet. In 1968, Puma SE introduced the first pair of sneakers with Velcro straps in lieu of shoelaces, and these became popular by the 1980s, especially among children and the elderly.

The  is the part that covers and protects the toes. People with toe deformities, or individuals who experience toe swelling (such as long-distance runners) usually require a larger toe box.

Types 
There are a wide variety of different types of shoes. Most types of shoes are designed for specific activities. For example, boots are typically designed for work or heavy outdoor use. Athletic shoes are designed for particular sports such as running, walking, or other sports. Some shoes are designed to be worn at more formal occasions, and others are designed for casual wear. There are also a wide variety of shoes designed for different types of dancing. Orthopedic shoes are special types of footwear designed for individuals with particular foot problems or special needs. Clinicians evaluate patient’s footwear as a part of their clinical examination. However, it is often based on each individual’s needs, with attention to the choice of footwear worn and if the shoe is adequate for the purpose of completing their activities of daily living. Other animals, such as dogs and horses, may also wear special shoes to protect their feet as well.

Depending on the activity for which they are designed, some types of footwear may fit into multiple categories. For example, Cowboy boots are considered boots, but may also be worn in more formal occasions and used as dress shoes. Hiking boots incorporate many of the protective features of boots, but also provide the extra flexibility and comfort of many athletic shoes. Flip-flops are considered casual footwear, but have also been worn in formal occasions, such as visits to the White House.

Athletic 

Athletic shoes are specifically designed to be worn for participating in various sports. Since friction between the foot and the ground is an important force in most sports, modern athletic shoes are designed to maximize this force, and materials, such as rubber, are used. Participants in sports in which sliding is desirable, such as dancing or bowling, wear shoes with lower coefficients of friction. The earliest athletic shoes, dating to the mid-19th century, were track spikes—leather shoes with metal cleats on the soles to provide increased friction during running. They were developed by J.W. Foster & Sons, which later become known as Reebok. By the end of the 19th century, Spalding also manufactured these shoes as well. Adidas started selling shoes with track spikes in them for running and soccer in 1925. Spikes were eventually added to shoes for baseball and American football in the 20th century. Golfers also use shoes with small metal spikes on their soles to prevent slipping during their swing.

The earliest rubber-soled athletic shoes date back to 1876 in the United Kingdom, when the New Liverpool Rubber Company made plimsolls, or sandshoes, designed for the sport of croquet. Similar rubber-soled shoes were made in 1892 in the United States by Humphrey O'Sullivan, based on Charles Goodyear's technology. The United States Rubber Company was founded the same year and produced rubber-soled and heeled shoes under a variety of brand names, which were later consolidated in 1916 under the name, Keds. These shoes became known as, "sneakers", because the rubber sole allowed the wearer to sneak up on another person. In 1964, the founding of Nike by Phil Knight and Bill Bowerman of the University of Oregon introduced many new improvements common in modern running shoes, such as rubber waffle soles, breathable nylon uppers, and cushioning in the mid-sole and heel. During the 1970s, the expertise of podiatrists also became important in athletic shoe design, to implement new design features based on how feet reacted to specific actions, such as running, jumping, or side-to-side movement. Athletic shoes for women were also designed for their specific physiological differences.

Shoes specific to the sport of basketball were developed by Chuck Taylor, and are popularly known as Chuck Taylor All-Stars. These shoes, first sold in 1917, are double-layer canvas shoes with rubber soles and toe caps, and a high heel (known as a "high top") for added support. In 1969, Taylor was inducted into the Naismith Memorial Basketball Hall of Fame in recognition of this development, and in the 1970s, other shoe manufacturers, such as Nike, Adidas, Reebok, and others began imitating this style of athletic shoe. In April 1985, Nike introduced its own brand of basketball shoe which would become popular in its own right, the Air Jordan, named after the then-rookie Chicago Bulls basketball player, Michael Jordan. The Air Jordan line of shoes sold $100 million in their first year.

As barefoot running became popular by the late 20th and early 21st century, many modern shoe manufacturers have recently designed footwear that mimic this experience, maintaining optimum flexibility and natural walking while also providing some degree of protection. Termed as Minimalist shoes, their purpose is to allow one's feet and legs to feel more subtly the impacts and forces involved in running, allowing finer adjustments in running style. Some of these shoes include the Vibram FiveFingers, Nike Free, and Saucony's Kinvara and Hattori. Mexican huaraches are also very simple running shoes, similar to the shoes worn by the Tarahumara people of northern Mexico, who are known for their distance running abilities. Wrestling shoes are also very light and flexible shoes that are designed to mimic bare feet while providing additional traction and protection.

Many athletic shoes are designed with specific features for specific activities. One of these includes roller skates, which have metal or plastic wheels on the bottom specific for the sport of roller skating. Similarly, ice skates have a metal blade attached to the bottom for locomotion across ice. Skate shoes have also been designed to provide a comfortable, flexible and durable shoe for the sport of skateboarding. Climbing shoes are rubber-soled, tight-fitting shoes designed to fit in the small cracks and crevices for rock climbing. Cycling shoes are similarly designed with rubber soles and a tight fit, but also are equipped with a metal or plastic cleat to interface with clipless pedals, as well as a stiff sole to maximize power transfer and support the foot. Some shoes are made specifically to improve a person's ability to weight train. Sneakers that are a mix between an activity-centered and a more standard design have also been produced: examples include roller shoes, which feature wheels that can be used to roll on hard ground, and Soap shoes, which feature a hard plastic sole that can be used for grinding.

Boot 

A boot is a special type of shoe which covers the foot and the ankle and extends up the leg, sometimes as far as the knee or even the hip. Most boots have a heel that is clearly distinguishable from the rest of the sole, even if the two are made of one piece. They are typically made of leather or rubber, although they may be made from a variety of different materials. Boots are worn both for their functionality—protecting the foot and leg from water, snow, mud or hazards or providing additional ankle support for strenuous activities—as well as for reasons of style and fashion.

Cowboy boots are a specific style of riding boots that combine function with fashion. They became popular among cowboys in the western United States during the 19th century. Traditional cowboy boots have a Cuban heel, rounded to pointed toe, high shaft, and, traditionally, no lacing. They are normally made from cowhide leather but may be made from more exotic skins such as ostrich, anaconda, or elephant skins.

Hiking boots are designed to provide extra ankle and arch support, as well as extra padding for comfort during hiking. They are constructed to provide comfort for miles of walking over rough terrains, and protect the hiker's feet against water, mud, rocks, and other wilderness obstacles. These boots support the ankle to avoid twisting but do not restrict the ankle's movement too much. They are fairly stiff to support the foot. A properly fitted boot and/or friction-reducing patches applied to troublesome areas ensures protection against blisters and other discomforts associated with long hikes on rugged terrain.

During wet or snowy weather, snow boots are worn to keep the foot warm and dry. They are typically made of rubber or other water-resistant material, have multiple layers of insulation, and a high heel to keep snow out. Boots may also be attached to snowshoes to increase the distribution of weight over a larger surface area for walking in snow. Ski boots are a specialized snow boot which are used in alpine or cross-country skiing and designed to provide a way to attach the skier to his/her skis using ski bindings. The ski/boot/binding combination is used to effectively transmit control inputs from the skier's legs to the snow. Ice skates are another specialized boot with a metal blade attached to the bottom which is used to propel the wearer across a sheet of ice. Inline skates are similar to ice skates but with a set of three to four wheels in lieu of the blade, which are designed to mimic ice skating on solid surfaces such as wood or concrete.

Boots are designed to withstand heavy wear to protect the wearer and provide good traction. They are generally made from sturdy leather uppers and non-leather outsoles. They may be used for uniforms of the police or military, as well as for protection in industrial settings such as mining and construction. Protective features may include steel-tipped toes and soles or ankle guards.

Dress and casual 
Dress shoes are characterized by smooth and supple leather uppers, leather soles, and narrow sleek figure. Casual shoes are characterized by sturdy leather uppers, non-leather outsoles, and wide profile.

Some designs of dress shoes can be worn by either gender. The majority of dress shoes have an upper covering, commonly made of leather, enclosing most of the lower foot, but not covering the ankles. This upper part of the shoe is often made without apertures or openings, but may also be made with openings or even itself consist of a series of straps, e.g. an open toe featured in women's shoes. Shoes with uppers made high to cover the ankles are also available; a shoe with the upper rising above the ankle is usually considered a boot but certain styles may be referred to as high-topped shoes or high-tops. Usually, a high-topped shoe is secured by laces or zippers, although some styles have elastic inserts to ease slipping the shoe on.

Men's 

Men's shoes can be categorized by how they are closed:
 Oxfords (also referred as "Balmorals"): the vamp has a V-shaped slit to which the laces are attached; also known as "closed lacing". The word "Oxford" is sometimes used by American clothing companies to market shoes that are not Balmorals, such as bluchers.
 Derby shoe: the laces are tied to two pieces of leather independently attached to the vamp; also known as "open lacing" and is a step down in dressiness. If the laces are not independently attached to the vamp, the shoe is known as a blucher shoe. This name is, in American English, often used about derbys.
 Monk-straps: a buckle and strap instead of lacing
 Slip-ons: There are no lacings or fastenings. The popular loafers are part of this category, as well as less popular styles, such as elastic-sided shoes.

Men's shoes can also be decorated in various ways:
 Plain-toes: have a sleek appearance and no extra decorations on the vamp.
 Cap-toes: has an extra layer of leather that "caps" the toe.
 Brogues (American: wing-tips): The toe of the shoe is covered with a perforated panel, the wing-tip, which extends down either side of the shoe. Brogues can be found in both balmoral and blucher styles, but are considered slightly less formal.

Formal high-end men's shoes are manufactured by several companies around the world, amongst others in Great Britain, France, Hungary, Romania, Croatia, Italy, and to a lesser extent in the United States. Notable British brands include: Church's English Shoes (est. 1873), John Lobb Bootmaker (est. 1849), Edward Green Shoes (est. 1890), and Crockett & Jones (est. 1879). Both John Lobb and Edward Green offer bespoke products. In between the world wars, men's footwear received significant innovation and design, led by cobblers and cordwainers in London's West End. A well-known French maker is J.M. Weston. Armani of Italy was a major influence on men's shoe design in the 1960s–1980s until they returned to the larger proportions of its forebears, the welt-constructed Anglo-American dress shoe originally created in Edwardian England. Another well-known Italian company is Salvatore Ferragamo Italia S.p.A. Higher end companies in the United States are Allen Edmonds and Alden Shoe Company. Alden, located in New England, specializes in genuine shell cordovan leather from the only remaining horse tannery in the US, in Chicago and is completely manufactured domestically, whereas Allen Edmonds of Wisconsin is a larger company that outsources some of its production.

Women's 

There is a large variety of shoes available for women, in addition to most of the men's styles being more accepted as unisex. Some broad categories are:
 High-heeled footwear is footwear that raises the heels, typically 2 inches (5 cm) or more above the toes, commonly worn by women for formal occasions or social outings. Variants include kitten heels (typically –2 inches high) and stiletto heels (with a very narrow heel post) and wedge heels (with a wedge-shaped sole rather than a heel post).
 Mules are shoes or slippers with no fitting around the heel (i.e. they are backless)
 Slingbacks are shoes which are secured by a strap behind the heel, rather than over the top of the foot.
 Ballet flats, known in the UK as ballerinas, ballet pumps or skimmers, are shoes with a very low heel and a relatively short vamp, exposing much of the instep. They are popular for warm-weather wear, and may be seen as more comfortable than shoes with a higher heel.
 Court shoes, known in the United States as pumps, are typically high-heeled, slip-on dress shoes.

Unisex 
 Clog
 Platform shoe: shoe with very thick soles and heels
 Sandals: open shoes consisting of a sole and various straps, leaving much of the foot exposed to air. They are thus popular for warm-weather wear, because they let the foot be cooler than a closed-toed shoe would.
 Saddle shoe: leather shoe with a contrasting saddle-shaped band over the instep, typically white uppers with black "saddle".
 Slip-on shoe: a dress or casual shoe without shoelaces or fasteners; often with tassels, buckles, or coin-holders (penny loafers).
 Boat shoes, also known as "deck shoes": similar to a loafer, but more casual. Laces are usually simple leather with no frills. Typically made of leather and featuring a soft white sole to avoid marring or scratching a boat deck. The first boat shoe was invented in 1935 by Paul A. Sperry.
 Slippers: For indoor use, commonly worn with pajamas.

Dance 
A wide variety of footwear is used by dancers. The choice of dance shoe type depends on the style of dance that is to be performed and, in many cases, the characteristics of the surface that will be danced on.
 Pointe shoes are designed for ballet dancing. These have a toe box that is stiffened with glue and a hardened sole so the dancer can stand on the tips of their toes. They are secured by elastic straps and ribbons that are tied to the dancer's ankles.
 Ballet shoes are soft, pliable shoes made of canvas or leather, with either continuous or two-part sole (also called split-sole), used for ballet dancing. The sole is typically made of leather, with thicker material under the ball and heel of the foot, and thinner and thus more flexible material under the arch so that the foot can be easily pointed. They are typically secured by elastics across the top of the foot.
 Ghillies are soft shoes that are used in Irish dance, Scottish country dance, and highland dance.
 Jazz shoes typically have a two-part rubberized sole (also called split-sole) to provide both flexibility and traction, and a short heel. They are secured to the foot by laces or elastic inserts.
 Tango and Flamenco shoes are used for tango or flamenco dancing.
 Ballroom shoes fall into two categories: Ballroom and Latin American. Both are characterised by suede soles. Men's ballroom shoes are typically lace-ups with one-inch heels and patent leather uppers. Ladies' ballroom shoes are typically court shoes with two-inch heels, made of fabric that can be colored to match the dancer's dress. In contrast to the low Ballroom heel, which evenly distributes weight across the foot, Latin American shoes have higher heels designed to shift weight onto the toes. Latin shoes are also more flexible than ballroom shoes. Men's Latin shoes typically have 1.5- to 2-inch high, shaped heels, while Ladies' Latin shoes have 2.5-inch to 3-inch heels. Ladies shoes are typically open-toed and strapped.
 Dance sneakers are lightweight sneakers with reinforced rubber toes that allows dancers to briefly stand on their toes. These are known by various trademarked names, such as dansneakers.
 Foot thongs are slip-on, partial foot covers that cover the ball of the dancer's foot so as to reduce friction while executing turns, thus making it easier to perform turns and also protecting the foot from skin abrasions. From a distance, flesh colored foot thongs give a dancer the appearance of having bare feet. They are known by various names depending on the manufacturer, including dance paws, foot undies, and foot paws.
 Tap shoes have metal plates mounted to the bottoms of the toe and heel. The metal plates, which are known as taps, make a loud sound when struck against a hard performance surface. Tap shoes, which are used in tap dancing, may be made from any style of shoe to which taps can be attached.
 Character shoes are leather shoes with one- to three-inch heels, usually with one or more straps across the instep to secure it to the foot. They may be soft-soled (suede) or hard-soled. They may be converted to tap shoes by attaching taps.
 Kierpce are traditional dance shoes in German, Polish, Slovakian, Lithuanian, Latvian and maybe other cultures. They are lightweight, do not have a sole, and are made with leather. Traditionally white wool socks are worn alongside kierpces.

Orthopedic 

Orthopedic shoes are specially-designed footwear to relieve discomfort associated with many foot and ankle disorders, such as blisters, bunions, calluses and corns, hammer toes, plantar fasciitis, or heel spurs. Certain types of therapeutic footwear are prescribed for children with mobility issues. They may also be worn by individuals with diabetes or people with unequal leg length. These shoes typically have a low heel, tend to be wide with a particularly wide toe box, and have a firm heel to provide extra support. Some may also have a removable insole, or orthotic, to provide extra arch support.

Measures and sizes 

The measure of a foot for a shoe is from the heel to the longest toe. Shoe size is an alphanumerical indication of the fitting size of a shoe for a person. Often it just consists of a number indicating the length because many shoemakers only provide a standard width for economic reasons. Worldwide, several different shoe-size systems are used, differing in their units of measurement and in the position of sizes 0 and 1. Only a few systems also take the width of the feet into account. Some regions use different shoe-size systems for different types of shoes (e.g., men's, women's, children's, sport, or safety shoes).

Units for shoe sizes vary widely around the world. European sizes are measured in Paris Points, each measuring two-thirds of a centimeter. The UK and American units result in whole-number sizes spaced at one barleycorn ( inch), with UK adult sizes starting at size 1 = . In the US, this is size 2. Men's and women's shoe sizes often have different scales. Shoe size is often measured using a Brannock Device, which can determine both the width and length size values of the foot. A metric standard for shoe sizing, the Mondopoint system, was introduced in the 1970s by International Standard ISO 2816:1973 "Fundamental characteristics of a system of shoe sizing to be known as Mondopoint" and ISO 3355:1975 "Shoe sizes – System of length grading (for use in the Mondopoint system)". the current version of the standard is ISO 9407:2019, "Shoe sizes—Mondopoint system of sizing and marking". The Mondopoint system includes measurements of both length and width of the foot.

Accessories 
 Foam tap: a small foam pad placed under the ball of the foot to push the foot up and back if the shoe is too loose.
 Heel grip: used to prevent the shoe from slipping on the heel if the fit is not perfect
 Overshoes or galoshes: a rubber covering placed over shoes for rain and snow protection.
 Shoe bag: a bag that protects shoes against damage when they are not being worn.
 Shoe brush and polishing cloth: used to apply polish to shoes.
 Shoe insert, insole or inner sole: orthopedic or regular insert of various materials for cushioning, improved fit, reduced abrasion or to keep shoe fresh and increase its durability. These include padding and inner linings. Inserts may also be used to correct foot problems.
 Shoe polish: a waxy material spread on shoes to improve appearance and glossiness, and provide protection.
 Shoe stretcher: a tool for making a shoe longer or wider or for reducing discomfort in areas of a shoe.
 Shoe tree: placed inside the shoe when user is not wearing it, to help maintain the shoe's shape.
 Shoehorn: can be used to insert a foot into a shoe by keeping the shoe open and providing a smooth surface for the foot to slide upon.
 Shoelaces: a system used to secure shoes.
 Snow shoe: a wooden or leather piece that increases the area of ground covered by the shoe.

Removal of shoes

In many places in the world shoes are removed when moving from exteriors to interiors, particularly in homes and religious buildings. In many Asian countries, outdoor shoes are exchanged for indoor shoes or slippers. Some fitness centres require that shoes be exchanged for indoor shoes to prevent dirt and grime from being transferred to the equipment.

See also 

 Foot binding
 List of shoe companies
 List of shoe styles
 Locomotor effects of shoes
 Runner's toe, injury from malfitting shoes
 Shoe dryer
 Shoe rack
 Shoe tossing
 Trousers

References

Bibliography 
 
 Doe, Tamasin (1998), Patrick Cox: Wit, Irony, and Footwear, .
 Pattison, Angela, A Century of Shoes: Icons of Style in the 20th Century, .
 Swann, June. History of Footwear in Norway, Sweden and Finland: Prehistory to 1950, .

Further reading
 Design Museum. Fifty Shoes That Changed the World. London: Conran Octopus, 2009. .

External links 

 All About Shoes—the Bata Shoe Museum's online exhibits on the history and variety of footwear
 Footwear History
 International Shoe Size Conversion Charts, from i18nguy's website, offers more information.
 Shoe Care
   - an illustrated glossary of shoe parts 
 2023 Women’s Casual Shoes Fashion: Breathable Mesh Flats, White For Women Sneakers/ best shoes

 
Articles containing video clips
Footwear
Protective gear